CTN-986 is a glycoside of quercetin found in cottonseeds and cottonseed oil. In a rodent model, it displays some antidepressant-like properties and stimulation of neurogenesis in the hippocampus. The neurogenesis appears to be mediated by activation of the 5-HT1A receptor, as co-administration with the 5-HT1A antagonist WAY-100,635 abolished the effect.

See also
 NSI-189

References

Quercetin glycosides